The Battle of Broken River, also known as the Faithfull Massacre, sometimes spelt Faithful Massacre, is a battle that took place in 1838 when 20 Aboriginal Australians attacked 18 European settlers, killing eight of them.

Reprisals against the Aboriginal people continued for many years afterwards, killing up to 100 people.

Description

On 11 April 1838, by the Broken River at Benalla, a party of some 18 men, employees of George and William Faithfull, were searching out new land to the south of Wangaratta for their livestock. According to Judith Bassett, some 20 Indigenous Australians attacked and at least one Koori and eight Europeans died. This was long known locally as the Faithfull Massacre.

There are conflicting accounts of the reason for the attack: one account suggests that it was retribution for Faithfull’s men shooting at the Aboriginal men on the Ovens River a week prior while another suggests that it was “revenge for the illicit use of Aboriginal women by the same party several weeks before”. While the incident has been referred to as a "massacre", the historian Chris Clark argues that "there is no reason to view this incident as anything other than a battle which the Aborigines won".

The settlers may have been camping on a ground reserved for hunting or ceremonies.

The site of the incident was re-discovered in 1907.

A son's account of the incident
A 1906 newspaper account ("particulars of which [were] obtained from a son of one of the number of the party") is as follows:

Reprisal killings
Around one hundred Aboriginal people were murdered in reprisal killings, which stretched on for many years.

Reprisals occurred at Wangaratta on the Ovens River, at Murchison (led by the native police under Henry Dana, with the young Edward Curr, who later said that he took issue with the official reports), Mitchelton and Toolamba. The colonial government decided to "open up" the lands south of Yass, New South Wales after the Faithfull Massacre and bring them under British rule, with one of the aims ostensibly to help protect the Aboriginal people from reprisal attacks.

See also
List of massacres of Indigenous Australians

References

Further reading

Faithful Massacre Site Memorial (archived version)

Massacres in Australia
History of Indigenous Australians